"Patricia" is a popular song, written by Benny Davis. The song was published in 1950. Perry Como recorded the song on August 10, 1950, and it was released on the following single records:
In the United States by RCA, as a 78rpm single (catalog number 20-3905-A) and a 45rpm single (catalog number 47-3905-A), with the flip side "Watchin' the Trains Go By". This record spent 12 weeks on the Billboard chart, beginning on September 22, 1950, and reached No. 7.
In the United Kingdom by HMV, as a 78rpm single (catalogue number B-10010) in January 1951, with the flip side "So Long Sally".
In Australia by HMV, as a 78rpm single (catalogue number EA 3951) in 1951, with the flip side "If You Were My Girl".

References

Songs written by Benny Davis
1950 songs
1950 singles
Perry Como songs
His Master's Voice singles
RCA Records singles